Baghlan (Dari:  Baġlān) is one of the thirty-four provinces of Afghanistan. It is in the north of the country. As of 2020, the province has a population of about 1,014,634.

Its capital is Puli Khumri, but its name comes from the other major town in the province, Baghlan. The ruins of a Zoroastrian fire temple, the Surkh Kotal, are located in Baghlan. The lead nation of the local Provincial Reconstruction Team (PRT) was Hungary, which operated from 2006 to 2015.

History

Early history
The name Baghlan is derived from Bagolango or "image-temple", inscribed on the temple of Surkh Kotal during the reign of the Kushan emperor Kanishka in the early 2nd century CE. The Chinese Buddhist monk Xuanzang traveled through Baghlan in the mid-7th century CE, and referred to it as the "kingdom of Fo-kia-lang".

In the 13th century CE, a permanent garrison of Mongol troops was quartered in the Kunduz-Baghlan area, and in 1253 fell under the jurisdiction of Sali Noyan Tatar, appointed by Möngke Khan. Sali Noyan's position was later inherited by his son Uladu and grandson Baktut. These Turco-Mongol garrison troops (tamma) formed the Qara'unas faction, and by the 14th Century had allied with the Chaghataite Khanate. Under the rule of Temür the Qara'unas were given to Chekü Barlas, and then to his son Jahānshāh. Beatrice Forbes Manz notes that these Kunduz-Baghlan forces appear to have remained cohesive and influential throughout the Timurid period, though under different leaders and different names, up until the Uzbek invasion. By the Islamic year 900 (1494–1495 CE), the area was noted in the Baburnama as ruled by a Qipchaq emir.

20th century
In the mid-20th century, as Afghanistan became the target of international development from both the Western and Soviet world, agricultural-industrial projects were initiated in Baghlan. These included factories for the production of sugar from sugar beets (initiated by Czech experts in the 1940s) and for vegetable oil. Czech expertise also figured heavily into the development of Baghlans' coal-mining industry, centred at Baghlan's Karkar Valley, the only coal mine in Afghanistan to remain operational up through 1992.

The modern Baghlan Province was created out of the former Qataghan Province in 1964.

During the Soviet–Afghan War, the Soviets in 1982 established the Kayan military zone in southern Baghlan. The area was defended by 10,000 Ismaili militiamen, increasing to 18,000 by 1992, who sided with the Soviets due to differences with the Islamist opposition. Afghan Ismailis overall were inclined to support the Communists, though a local Ismaili leader, Sayed Manuchehr, lead a partisan movement against the Communists until Ismaili leader Sayed Mansur Naderi accepted Soviet support.

Large portions of Baghlan and neighbouring Samangan Province were under the sway of the Soviet-aligned Naderi clan, the hereditary Ismaili Sayeds (spiritual leaders) of Kayan. Under their jurisdiction, was largely quiet and societally functional throughout the 1980s, with hospitals, schools, and administrative services, funded by the communist central government. Despite the Naderi's alliance with the Communists, they also maintained positive relations with the Mujahideen as well, permitting them to move through the area provided they refrained from attacks.

One of the Soviets' three primary bases in Afghanistan, Kiligai, was located in Baghlan Province, and served as the "largest military supply and armoury centre of the Soviet troops in Afghanistan."

Recent history

As the 2001 Afghan War commenced, Ismaili leader Sayed Mansoor Naderi attempted to retake Baghlan from the Taliban. Naderi was aligned with Uzbek warlord Abdul Rashid Dostum and his Jumbesh-e Milli party, and the competing Tajik-dominated Jamiat-e Islami party was also keen to seize control of Baghlan as Taliban power eroded. The Jamiat were able to seize the capital of Pul-i Khumri before Naderi, who despite his strong backing among the Afghan Ismailis and Shia Hazaras, was unable to rally enough supporters to control the province. Naderi failed to retake the capital in 2001 and 2003, in the latter event he negotiated a power-sharing agreement with the dominant Andarabi militias and made the Ismaili bastion of the Kayan Valley his base.

On 13 June 2012, two earthquakes hit Afghanistan and there was a major landslide in Burka District of Baghlan Province. The village of Sayi Hazara was buried under up to 30 meters of rock, killing an estimated 71 people.

On 13 April 2021, an official in Baghlan Province said a group of Taliban militants attacked a checkpoint in the province that day and killed six security personnel.

Claiming that the Taliban had not acted in the spirit of amnesty, the Public's Resistance Forces under Khair Muhammad Andarabi reportedly attacked Taliban fighters 20 August 2021 in several parts of Baghlan province, inflicting up to 60 Taliban killed or wounded. They claim to have captured Puli Hisar, Dih Salah and Banu districts, and are advancing on other Taliban-held districts. Clashes were still reported in Baghlan province by January 2022.

Politics and governance

The town of Puli Khumri serves as the capital of the province. All law enforcement activities throughout the province are handled by the Afghan National Police (ANP). The provincial police chief represents the Ministry of the Interior in Kabul. The ANP is backed by the Afghan Armed Forces, and previously by NATO-led forces. Taj Mohammad Jahid has been the governor of the province since July 2020.

Demographics

According to the National Statistics Agency of Afghanistan, as of 2021, Tajiks and Hazaras make up the majority of the population, followed by Pashtuns and Uzbeks.

Baghlan is also home to a small community of Ismaili Hazaras, led by the Sayeds of Kayan.

Healthcare

The percentage of households with clean drinking water increased from 19% in 2005 to 25% in 2011.
The percentage of births attended to by a skilled birth attendant increased from 5.5% in 2005 to 22% in 2011.

Education

The overall literacy rate (6+ years of age) increased from 21% in 2005 to 24% in 2011.
The overall net enrolment rate (6–13 years of age) increased from 29% in 2005 to 62% in 2011.

Economy

Agriculture
Baghlan's primary crops (as of 1974) were cotton and sugar beets, industrial sugar production having begun under Czech supervision in the 1940s. The area also produced grapes, pistachios, and pomegranates. The primary livestock is Karakul sheep.

Other products
The province also produces silk, and coal is mined in the Karkar Valley.

Districts

See also
 Baghlan
 2007 Baghlan sugar factory bombing

References

External links

 
Provinces of Afghanistan
States and territories established in 1964
Provinces of the Islamic Republic of Afghanistan